Splendrillia aurora is a species of sea snail, a marine gastropod mollusk in the family Drilliidae.

Description
The length of the shell attains 9 mm.

Distribution
This species occurs in the demersal zone off Sumatra, Indonesia and off the Philippines.

References

  Tucker, J.K. 2004 Catalog of recent and fossil turrids (Mollusca: Gastropoda). Zootaxa 682:1–1295.
  Thiele J., 1925. Gastropoden der Deutschen Tiefsee-Expedition. In:. Wissenschaftliche Ergebnisse der Deutschen Tiefsee-Expedition auf dem Dampfer "Valdivia" 1898–1899  II. Teil, vol. 17, No. 2, Gustav Fischer, Berlin

External links
 

aurora
Gastropods described in 1925